Wisconsin Point is a peninsula off the shore of Superior in Douglas County, Wisconsin, United States.  in length, it is in the Lake Superior National Estuarine Research Reserve. The point is the world's largest freshwater bay mouth sand bar. The Wisconsin Point Lighthouse, built in 1913, is situated on the end of the peninsula. Wisconsin Point is owned and maintained by the city of Superior. Other features of Wisconsin Point include a Native American burial ground, extensive beaches and vistas of the city of Duluth, Minnesota, and a diverse forest and lagoon ecosystem. It is a well-known spot for birding during spring and fall migrations and ducks, shorebirds, gulls, hawks, and songbirds, such as warblers, finches, and sparrows, can be seen.

See also
 Minnesota Point

Notes

Landforms of Douglas County, Wisconsin
Peninsulas of Wisconsin
Birdwatching
Superior, Wisconsin